All My Best is the second greatest hits album by Japanese pop and R&B singer-songwriter, Mai Kuraki. It was released on September 9, 2009, to commemorate her tenth anniversary in the music business. The album was issued in seven formats: a regular 2CD, a limited 2CD+DVD, a limited microSD, a USB flash drive, a MiniDisc, a compact cassette and an LP album. The album debuted at the top of the Japanese Oricon weekly album chart with sales over 137,050.

Singles 
To promote the album, two singles were released: "Puzzle/Revive" and "Beautiful". On the Oricon single chart "Puzzle/Revive" entered the top 3, becoming Kuraki's first single since  in 2004 to do so. "Puzzle" was the ending theme song for the thirteenth Detective Conan movie Detective Conan: The Raven Chaser. Unlike "Puzzle", "Revive" was not on the album. "Beautiful" was used as the image song for the cosmetic company Kose's Coseport Salon Style. The single ranked higher than "Puzzle/Revive" debuting at No. 2, which extended Kuraki's record as the only female solo artist to have all 32 of her singles in the Top 10 since her debut.

Commercial performance 
On the release day of All My Best in Japan, the album took the number one position on the Oricon daily album chart, selling 38,000 copies. On the weekly chart issue dated September 21, the album was No. 1 with sales a little over 137,050, becoming Kuraki's second number-one album of 2009. The album also debuted at the top of the Billboard Japan Top Albums chart. In Taiwan, the album achieved moderate success debuting at numbers nine and seven, on the international and J-pop charts respectively. On the J-Pop chart, the album peaked at number five. With 0.51% of sales on the Taiwanese Combo chart the album debuted at number eighteen.

Track listing

Charts and certifications

Sales and certifications

Release history

References

External links 
Mai Kuraki Official Website

Mai Kuraki albums
2009 compilation albums
Being Inc. compilation albums
Japanese-language compilation albums
Albums produced by Daiko Nagato